Orkney may refer to:

Scotland
Orkney, an archipelago in Scotland, also known as the Orkney Islands
Mainland, Orkney, the largest island in the Orkney archipelago
Orkney (Scottish Parliament constituency), the constituency for the Orkney Islands in the Scottish Parliament in Edinburgh
Orkney Islands Council, the local authority for Orkney

Antarctica
South Orkney Islands, a group of islands in the South Atlantic Ocean.

South Africa
Orkney, North West, a mining town in South Africa
Orkney Snork Nie, a sitcom in Afrikaans set in Orkney, North West Province

Canada
Rural Municipality of Orkney No. 244, Saskatchewan
Orkney, Saskatchewan, a village

United States
Orkney, Kentucky

See also
Orkney and Shetland (UK Parliament constituency) the constituency for Orkney  in the British Parliament in London
Orkney Movement, part of an electoral coalition, the Orkney and Shetland Movement, formed for the 1987 UK general election
Heart of Neolithic Orkney, a World Heritage Site on Mainland Orkney